The use of metals in industries has been vast and almost every manufacturing industry uses different kinds of metals. There are a number of processes by which metals are processed into different forms. Die casting is one of the popular manufacturing processes. It is preferred above all other kinds of processes due to the quality of the finished goods and also the ease of manufacture.

Zinc is a widely used and easily available metal. Zinc die casting applications are widespread and are all around us everywhere. Zinc alloy die casting is used for numerous decoration and functional applications.

Advantages 

There are many benefits of using Zinc alloy over others.

Thinner wall sections can be achieved compared to other metals due to high casting fluidity.
High production rates can be achieved.
The number of secondary machining operations is very little or none at all.
The surfaces of the finished products can be made really smooth.
It is very easy to cast in inserts like threaded inserts, heating elements, and high strength bearing surfaces.
It is possible to cast low fluidity metals.
Very high dimensional accuracy can be obtained.
The casts are able to achieve high tensile strengths as well.

Zinc alloys are strong, and stable with high dimensional accuracy and thermal conductivity, resisting to corrosion, and are recyclable.

References

 Why Zinc Alloy Die Casting Becomes the Prime Choice for Manufacturers?
 Where to find Zinc Die Casting Manufacturer?
 

Casting (manufacturing)
Zinc alloys